Roman Bodnya (born 21 June 2001) is a Ukrainian football midfielder.

Career
Born in Dnipro, Bodnya began his training career in the local FC Inter youth sportive school, and after continued in the FC Shakhtar and FC Dynamo youth sportive systems.

He played in the Ukrainian Premier League Reserves and never made his debut for the senior Dynamo Kyiv's squad. In February 2021 Bodnya signed half-year loan contract with the Ukrainian First League FC Chornomorets Odesa.

References

External links
Profile at the Official UAF Site (Ukr)

2001 births
Living people
Footballers from Dnipro
Ukrainian footballers
FC Dynamo Kyiv players
FC Chornomorets Odesa players
FC Mynai players
Association football midfielders
Ukrainian First League players
Ukraine youth international footballers